The siege of Danzig (16 January 1813 – 2 January 1814) was a siege of the city of Danzig during the War of the Sixth Coalition by Russian and Prussian forces against Jean Rapp's permanent French garrison, which had been augmented by soldiers from the Grande Armée retreating from its Russian campaign. The garrison included two crack divisions under Étienne Heudelet de Bierre and Charles Louis Dieudonné Grandjean plus whole units and stragglers that had lost contact with their units, all with their health and morale both weakened and most of their equipment lost and carrying their wounded. The siege was begun by cossacks under hetman Matvei Platov, then was continued mainly by infantry, mainly militiamen and irregulars. It lasted ended in a French surrender to Coalition forces.

Background
The Treaty of Tilsit of 1807 had made the city a Free City nominally under Prussian control. It was sited at the mouth of the River Vistula and along the coast of the Baltic Sea and then had 60,000 inhabitants. It was also a major supply depot for Napoleon's force, with large quantities of food, munitions, forage, weapons, clothing and ammunition, and needed to be held by his forces to keep the Prussians neutral and avoid them defecting to the coalition (as they later did). He was also attempting to re-group an army in his rear in order to confront the Coalition, and so needed to guard the line of the Vistula by garrisoning Danzig, Thorn and Warsaw.

See also

Sieges of Danzig
Siege of Danzig (1807)

Notes

References

Further reading
 
 
 
 The Siege of Dantzic, in 1813 at the Internet Archive

External links
 

Battles of the War of the Sixth Coalition
Sieges of the Napoleonic Wars
Sieges involving France
Sieges involving Germany
Sieges involving Prussia
Sieges involving Russia
Battles involving Prussia
Conflicts in 1813
1813 in Prussia
Siege
Events in Gdańsk